Ardit Deliu (born 26 October 1997) is an Albanian professional footballer who  plays as a defensive midfielder for Kategoria Superiore club Tirana  .

Club career

Early career
Deliu started his youth career in 2011 at local club Besa as a 14 years old. During the 2012–13 season he played for the under-17 side managed by Ylli Teliti forming a strong duo striker partnership with Regi Lushkja, where in the first half of the season the duo scored 90% off all Besa Under-17 goals.

Besa
He gained entry with the first team in 2014 as he was included by the coach Artan Mërgjyshi to participate in an Albanian Cup match against Veleçiku on 22 October 2014 where he also made his debut by coming on as a substitute in the 46th minute in place of Darlien Bajaziti. One month later Deliu made his league debut against Burreli on 22 November 2014 and also scored his first goal for Besa.

He concluded the season with 4 league appearances in total scoring 2 goals and a single Domestic cup appearance.

RNK Split
On 27 August 2015 Deliu signed with Croatian side RNK Split following the recommendation of Sokol Cikalleshi, the fellow Albanian player of RNK Split during the 2014–15 season. Being underage, he wasn't registered until February 2016.

Hajduk Split
On 7 February 2017 Deliu signed with HNK Hajduk Split II until June 2018.

International career

Albania U17 
Deliu was part of the Albania national under-17 football team of coach Džemal Mustedanagić in the 2014 UEFA European Under-17 Championship, appearing in 5 out 6 matches between qualifying round and elite round, completing 3 full 80-minute matches in the qualifying round and two appearances as a substitute in the elite round.

Albania U19 
Deliu advanced at Albania national under-19 football team as he was invited by coach Arjan Bellai to participate in the 2016 UEFA European Under-19 Championship qualification from 12 to 17 November 2015. He played two full 90-minutes matches against Austria U19 in a 1–2 loss and Georgia U19 in the 0–1 loss, where he received a yellow card yellow card for each match and missed the closing match.

Albania U21 
Deliu received a call up at Albania national under-21 football team by coach Alban Bushi for a gathering in Durrës, Albania from 18 to 25 January 2017. He was invited again in the next gathering two months later for a double Friendly match against Moldova U21 on 25 & 27 March 2017.

Career statistics

Club

Honours

Club 
Tirana
Albanian Supercup: 2022

References

External links

1997 births
Living people
Footballers from Durrës
Albanian footballers
Sportspeople from Durrës
People from Durrës County
People from Durrës
Association football midfielders
Albania youth international footballers
Albania under-21 international footballers
Besa Kavajë players
RNK Split players
KF Laçi players
FK Liepāja players
Kategoria Superiore players
Croatian Football League players
Latvian Higher League players
Albanian expatriate footballers
Albanian expatriate sportspeople in Croatia
Expatriate footballers in Croatia
Albanian expatriate sportspeople in Latvia
Expatriate footballers in Latvia
Albania international footballers